Pandit Govind Malaviya (14 September 1902–27 February 1961) was an Indian freedom fighter, educationist and politician.

Biography
Malaviya was the youngest son of distinguished lawyer and educationist Pandit Madan Mohan Malaviya. Following his early education at the Dharmajnyanopadesha Sanskrit Pathshala and the A. V. School, Allahabad, he graduated from Banaras Hindu University. After joining the Congress Party in 1920, he actively participated in the Independence movement and was imprisoned eight times. In 1930, he was appointed general secretary of the Working Committee of the All India Congress Committee (AICC), and attended the Second Round Table Conference in September 1931 as his father's secretary.

In 1945, he was elected to the Central Legislative Assembly, becoming a member of the Constituent Assembly of India in 1946 and a member of the Provisional Parliament in 1950. He was appointed Pro-Vice-Chancellor of Banaras Hindu University in December 1947, becoming Vice-Chancellor in December 1948 and serving until 1951.

In 1952, Malaviya was elected to the Lok Sabha (lower house of the Parliament of India) from Sultanpur, Uttar Pradesh as a member of the Indian National Congress. Reelected in 1957, he died in office in 1961.

Personal life
He married Usha Bhatt (1905–18 February 2002) on 12 December 1922. The couple had one son, Justice Giridhar Malaviya, and seven daughters.

References

India MPs 1957–1962
India MPs 1962–1967
Indian National Congress politicians
Members of the Constituent Assembly of India
Lok Sabha members from Uttar Pradesh
People from Sultanpur district
1902 births
1961 deaths
Indian National Congress politicians from Uttar Pradesh